Ivan Vladimirovich Sergeyev (born 11 May 1995) is a Russian professional footballer who plays as a striker for Zenit Saint Petersburg.

Club career

Strogino Moscow
He made his professional debut in the Russian Professional Football League for FC Strogino Moscow on 19 April 2014 in a game against FC Lokomotiv-2 Moscow.

Tambov
He made his Russian Football National League debut for FC Tambov on 4 March 2018 in a game against FC Rotor Volgograd.

Torpedo Moscow
On 11 June 2019, he signed a 2-year contract with FC Torpedo Moscow after playing for the club on loan in the 2018–19 season.

Krylia Sovetov
On 14 August 2020, he signed a 2-year contract with PFC Krylia Sovetov Samara. His first season with Krylia Sovetov was extremely productive, Krylia Sovetov won the 2020–21 Russian Football National League and Sergeyev has set a new record for most goals in one season of the Russian second tier, with 39 goals scored as of 5 May 2021. He finished the season with 40 goals. He made his Russian Premier League debut for PFC Krylia Sovetov Samara on 25 July 2021 in a game against FC Akhmat Grozny.

Zenit Saint Petersburg
On 10 January 2022, Zenit Saint Petersburg announced the signing of Sergeev with a 3-season contract.

International career
He was called up to the Russia national football team for the first time in October 2021 for the World Cup qualifiers against Cyprus and Croatia. He was included in the extended 41-players list of candidates.

Honours

Torpedo Moscow
 Russian Professional Football League (Zone Center): 2019

Krylia Sovetov Samara
 Russian Football National League: 2021

Zenit Saint Petersburg
 Russian Premier League: 2021–22
 Russian Super Cup: 2022

Individual
 Russian Professional Football League Zone Center top scorer (16 goals) (2017–18)
 Russian Professional Football League Zone Center top scorer (16 goals) (2018–19).
 Russian Football National League top scorer (14 goals) (2019–20).
 Russian Football National League top scorer (40 goals) (2020–21).

Career statistics

References

External links
 
 
 

1995 births
People from Cherepovets
Living people
Russian footballers
Association football midfielders
FC Strogino Moscow players
Riga FC players
FC Tambov players
FC Torpedo Moscow players
PFC Krylia Sovetov Samara players
FC Zenit Saint Petersburg players
Latvian Higher League players
Russian Premier League players
Russian First League players
Russian Second League players
Russian expatriate footballers
Expatriate footballers in Latvia
Russian expatriate sportspeople in Latvia
Sportspeople from Vologda Oblast